Bernard Tomic was the last edition champion, and he successfully defended his title by defeating Adrian Mannarino in the final, 6–1, 3–6, 6–2.

Seeds
The top four seeds receive a bye into the second round.

Draw

Finals

Top half

Bottom half

Qualifying

Seeds

Qualifiers

Qualifying draw

First qualifier

Second qualifier

Third qualifier

Fourth qualifier

References

External links
Main Draw
Qualifying Draw

Claro Open Colombia - Singles
2015 Singles